Anomiopus gracilis  is a species of true dung beetle that can be found in Brazil and Venezuela.

References

gracilis
Beetles described in 2006